Shiawase No Iro is the second studio album by , released on 6 December 2006.

Track listing

espresso

Number

Jewelry Heart

LOVE@MESSENGER

References
Official Discography of Ai Nonaka

2006 albums
Ai Nonaka albums